Kevin Lawrence (born 18 October 1987) is a South African cricket umpire. He has stood in domestic matches in the 2017–18 Sunfoil 3-Day Cup and the 2016–17 CSA Provincial One-Day Challenge.

References

External links
 

1987 births
Living people
South African cricket umpires
Place of birth missing (living people)